Vincenzo Catena (c. 1480–1531) was an Italian  painter of the Renaissance Venetian school. He is also known as Vincenzo de Biagio.

Life
Nothing is known of the date and place of Catena's birth. The earliest known record of him is in an inscription on the back of Giorgione's Laura, in which he is described as the painter's Cholego. Catena's early style is however, much closer to that of Giovanni Bellini than the innovative work of Giorgione, and it was not until a few years after Giorgione's death in 1510 that his influence began to show itself in Catena's output. There are about a dozen signed paintings by Catena in existence, although only one of these, the Martyrdom of St Christina (1520) in the church of Santa Maria Mater Domini in Venice, can be dated with any certainty, from an inscription on its marble surround.
Catena's wills indicate that he was a man of some wealth, and that he had friends in Venetian humanist circles.

References

Sources

 Web Gallery of Art
 Adoration of the Shepherds

External links
Vincenzo Catena on Artcyclopedia
Italian Paintings, Venetian School, a collection catalog containing information about Catena and his works (see index; plate 16-17).

1470s births
1531 deaths
15th-century Italian painters
Italian male painters
16th-century Italian painters
Painters from Venice
Renaissance painters